The 1968 United States House of Representatives elections in South Carolina were held on November 5, 1968, to select six Representatives for two-year terms from the state of South Carolina.  The primary elections were held on June 11 and the runoff elections were held two weeks later on June 25.  All five incumbents who ran were re-elected and the open seat in the 5th district was retained by the Democrats.  The composition of the state delegation remained five Democrats and one Republican.

1st congressional district
Incumbent Democratic Congressman L. Mendel Rivers of the 1st congressional district, in office since 1941, defeated black attorney George A. Payton, Jr. in the Democratic primary and was unopposed in the general election.  Charleston County Republican Party chairman James B. Edwards was prepared to run in the general election had George A. Payton, Jr. won the Democratic primary.

Democratic primary

General election results

|-
| 
| colspan=5 |Democratic hold
|-

2nd congressional district
Incumbent Republican Congressman Albert Watson of the 2nd congressional district, in office since 1963, defeated Democratic challenger Frank K. Sloan.

General election results

|-
| 
| colspan=5 |Republican hold
|-

3rd congressional district
Incumbent Democratic Congressman William Jennings Bryan Dorn of the 3rd congressional district, in office since 1951, defeated Republican challenger John Grisso.

General election results

|-
| 
| colspan=5 |Democratic hold
|-

4th congressional district
Incumbent Democratic Congressman Robert T. Ashmore of the 4th congressional district, in office since 1953, opted to retire.  James R. Mann won the Democratic primary and defeated Republican challenger Charles Bradshaw in the general election.

Democratic primary

General election results

|-
| 
| colspan=5 |Democratic hold
|-

5th congressional district
Incumbent Democratic Congressman Thomas S. Gettys of the 5th congressional district, in office since 1964, defeated Fred R. Sheheen in the Democratic primary and Republican Hugh J. Boyd in the general election.

Democratic primary

General election results

|-
| 
| colspan=5 |Democratic hold
|-

6th congressional district
Incumbent Democratic Congressman John L. McMillan of the 6th congressional district, in office since 1939, defeated Richard G. Dusenbury in the Democratic primary and Republican Ray Harris in the general election.

Democratic primary

General election results

|-
| 
| colspan=5 |Democratic hold
|-

See also
United States House elections, 1968
United States Senate election in South Carolina, 1968
South Carolina's congressional districts

Notes

References

South Carolina
United States House of Representatives
1968